XPEC Entertainment is a Taiwanese video game developer and publisher based in Taipei. It was founded in 2000.

Games

References

External links
 
 

Taiwanese companies established in 2000
Video game companies established in 2000
Video game companies of Taiwan
Video game development companies
Companies based in Taipei